The  in Kurashiki was the first collection of Western art to be permanently exhibited in Japan. The museum opened in 1930 and originally consisted almost entirely of French paintings and sculptures of the 19th and 20th centuries. The collection has now expanded to include paintings of the Italian Renaissance and of the Dutch and Flemish 17th century. Well-known American and Italian artists of the 20th century are also included in the collection.

The basis of the collection was formed by Ōhara Magosaburō on the advice of the Japanese painter Kojima Torajirō (1881–1929) and the French artist Edmond Aman-Jean (1860–1935).

In 1961 a wing was added for acquired Japanese paintings of the first half of the 20th century: Fujishima Takeji, Aoki Shigeru, Kishida Ryūsei, Koide Tarushige and others. In the same year, a wing for potteries of Kawai Kanjirō, Bernard Leach, Hamada Shōji, Tomimoto Kenkichi and others was opened. 1963 a wing was added for the woodcuts of Munakata Shikō and dyeings of Serisawa Keisuke. Today the last two wings are combined as Crafts Wing (Kōgei-kan). 1972 the Kojima Torajirō Memorial Hall was opened at the Ivory Square of Kurashiki.

Selected collection highlights

Selected artists

 El Greco (Annunciation)
 Pierre Puvis de Chavannes
 Camille Pissarro
 Edgar Degas
 Claude Monet (Water Lilies)
 Pierre-Auguste Renoir
 Paul Gauguin
 Giovanni Segantini
 Henri de Toulouse-Lautrec
 Amedeo Clemente Modigliani
 Pablo Picasso
 Jackson Pollock
 Maurice Utrillo
 Giorgio de Chirico
 Georges Rouault
 Henri Matisse
 Pierre Bonnard
 Jasper Johns
 Auguste Rodin
 Narashige Koide
 Yuzo Saeki
 Fujishima Takeji
 Ryuzaburo Umehara
 Sōtarō Yasui
 Shikō Munakata
 Tadanori Yokoo

Access
 Public Transportation
Take Sanyo Shinkansen to Okayama Station.  Change to Sanyo Line to Kurashiki Station.  The museum is about 15-20 min walk.

External links

Virtual tour of the Ohara Museum of Art provided by Google Arts & Culture

Art museums and galleries in Japan
Museums in Okayama Prefecture
Art museums established in 1930
1930 establishments in Japan
Kurashiki